Un drame au château d'Acre is a 1915 short silent French drama film directed by Abel Gance.

Cast
 Yvonne Briey
 Henri Maillard
 Aurelio Sidney (as Aurele Sydney)
 Jacques Volnys
 Jean Toulout as Ermont

References

External links

1915 films
1910s French-language films
French drama films
French silent short films
1915 drama films
1915 short films
French black-and-white films
Films directed by Abel Gance
Silent drama films
1910s French films